Young Apollo, Op. 16, is a music composition for piano, string quartet and string orchestra composed by Benjamin Britten.

Commissioned by the Canadian Broadcasting Corporation, the work was completed in 1939, just after Britten's arrival in the United States. It carries as an epigraph the final lines of "Hyperion", an incomplete poem by John Keats but the work was inspired by Wulff Scherchen, a young, German blond who was Britten's first love interest.

The work premiered on 27 August 1939 on CBC Radio's Melodic Strings with Britten as soloist and Alexander Chuhaldin conducting. Britten dedicated the work to Chuhaldin. The composer withdrew the work following a second performance on 20 December in New York, without explanation. It was not performed again until 1979 when it was revived at that year's Aldeburgh Festival, with Steuart Bedford conducting the English Chamber Orchestra and Michael Roll as soloist.

Young Apollo first appeared on disc three years later, with Peter Donohoe as soloist, and the City of Birmingham Symphony Orchestra under Simon Rattle.

References

Chamber music compositions
Compositions by Benjamin Britten
Concertos by Benjamin Britten
1939 compositions